Thomas E. West (born October 12, 1964) is an American businessman and politician who served as the State Representative for the 49th District of the Ohio House of Representatives from 2017–2023. He is a member of the Democratic Party. The district consists of a portion of Stark County, including Canton and most of Massillon.

Life and career
A licensed social worker, West also owned and operated several small businesses before entering politics. He holds a bachelor's degree from the Mount Union College, and received his Masters in Social Work from the University of Akron.

West served on the Canton City Council for 13 years, acting as the Chairman of the Annexation Committee and a member of the Capital Improvement Committee, Special Improvement District and Canton Community Improvement Corporation. He is married with two children.

Ohio House of Representatives

Campaigns
In 2016, state Representative Stephen Slesnick was term-limited after serving in the House since 2008.  West was one of two Democrats to declare interest in the seat, along with Joyce-Healy Abrams, the daughter of William J. Healy, who represented the seat for twenty-five years, and granddaughter of William J. Healy II, who had also represented the seat and was the former Mayor of Canton. Healy-Abrams herself had run for Congress against Bob Gibbs in 2012, losing a close race. Despite her name recognition, West ended up winning by 110 votes.

West defeated Republican Dan McMasters 57% to 43% in the general election. He was sworn in on January 3, 2017.

West increased his margin of victory in his 2018 reelection, defeating Republican candidate James Haavisto 58% to 42%. West defeated Haavisto again in a rematch in 2020.

Committees and Caucuses
West served on the following committees: Health, Criminal Justice, Finance, Aging and Long Term Care, Finance Subcommittee on Health and Human Services, and the Joint Medicaid Oversight Committee. In November 2020, West was elected President of the Ohio Legislative Black Caucus. In addition to his legislative committees and caucuses, West also received gubernatorial appointments to the Ohio Commission on Fatherhood, Ohio Advisory on Aging, and the Governor’s Executive Workforce Board.

Election history

References

External links
Ohio State Representative Tom West official site

1964 births
Living people
Democratic Party members of the Ohio House of Representatives
21st-century American politicians
University of Akron alumni
University of Mount Union alumni